Corpse Husband (born August 8, 1997), commonly abbreviated as Corpse and stylized as CORPSE, is an American YouTuber and musician. Corpse is best known for his music and "faceless" work on YouTube. He is mostly known for his horror story narration and Among Us content. He also gained notable recognition for his deep low-pitched voice.

Early life 
Corpse was born on August 8, 1997, in San Diego, California.

Career 
In 2015, Corpse began his career on YouTube by narrating horror stories on his channel, which he did consecutively until 2020. He made his musical debut in 2016, being featured on the single "Grim Grinning Ghost" by record producer The Living Tombstone and musical artist CrusherP.

In June 2020, Corpse released his debut single "Miss You!", which peaked at number 31 on the Hot Rock & Alternative Songs chart. His follow-up single "White Tee", which was released in the same month, reached number 32 on the same chart. In September 2020, Corpse began streaming and creating content on the video game Among Us, which brought him much recognition, and has since gained over 7 million subscribers on YouTube. In the same month, he released the single "E-Girls Are Ruining My Life!", featuring vocals from rapper Savage Ga$p, which generated wide-spread commercial success for Corpse in 2020. The song charted at 28 in Bulgaria, 90 on the UK Singles Chart, and 24 in Billboards Bubbling Under Hot 100 chart. It also reached more than 100 million streams on Spotify, and was ranked second on Spotify's Viral 50 songs chart. In 2022, it became his first track to be certified platinum by the Recording Industry Association of America.

In October 2020, he worked with U.S. representatives Alexandria Ocasio-Cortez and Ilhan Omar along with several other notable streamers including Disguised Toast, Cr1TiKaL and Pokimane for a session of Among Us as part of a get-out-the-vote initiative for the 2020 United States presidential election. The same month, he released the single "Agoraphobic", which debuted at number 21 on the Hot Rock & Alternative Songs chart four months later.

In March 2021, Corpse was featured on Machine Gun Kelly's song "DayWalker". On March 18, 2021, a music video for the song was released, featuring fellow YouTuber and streamer Valkyrae portraying Corpse. The song became Corpse's first Billboard Hot 100 entry, charting at number 88, and second on the UK Singles Chart, peaking at number 53.

In April 2021, Corpse participated in an hour-long charity Among Us stream on The Tonight Show with Jimmy Fallon, members of The Roots, fellow streamers Valkyrae and Sykkuno, and Stranger Things actors Gaten Matarazzo and Noah Schnapp, with proceeds going towards Feeding America.

In September 2021, Corpse released a single entitled "Hot Demon B!tches Near U!!!" in collaboration with Night Lovell.

In February 2022, Funimation announced Corpse's English dub debut voice role as Ōjirō Ōtori in the anime adaptation of Kazutaka Kodaka's Tribe Nine.

Personal life
Corpse has conditions such as fibromyalgia, thoracic outlet syndrome and GERD, the latter of which has partially caused his voice to become deeper. He has also stated that he frequently wears an eyepatch due to strain from the brightness of blue light screens.

Filmography

Television

Discography

Singles

As a lead artist

As a featured artist

References

External links

 
 

Living people
21st-century American artists
American male artists
American male rappers
American YouTubers
Gaming YouTubers
1997 births
American musicians of Mexican descent
American people of Irish descent
Unidentified musicians